= David Crockett Jones Jr. =

American politician

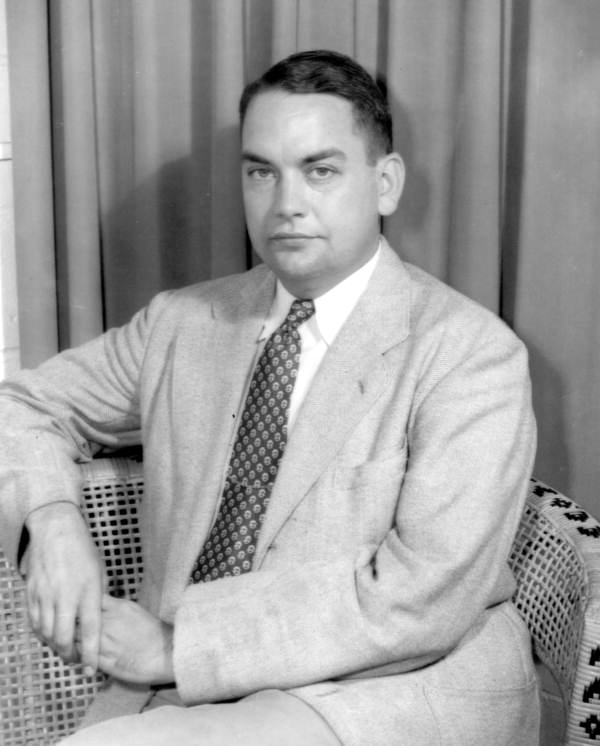
- Jones in 1953

Member of the Florida House of Representatives from Collier County
- In office 1953–1956

Personal details
- Born: December 2, 1923
- Died: November 3, 2004 (aged 80)
- Party: Democratic
- Parent: David Crockett Jones Sr. (father)

David Crockett Jones Jr. (December 2, 1923 – November 3, 2004) was an American politician. He served as a Democratic member of the Florida House of Representatives.
