= David Crockett Jones Sr. =

American politician

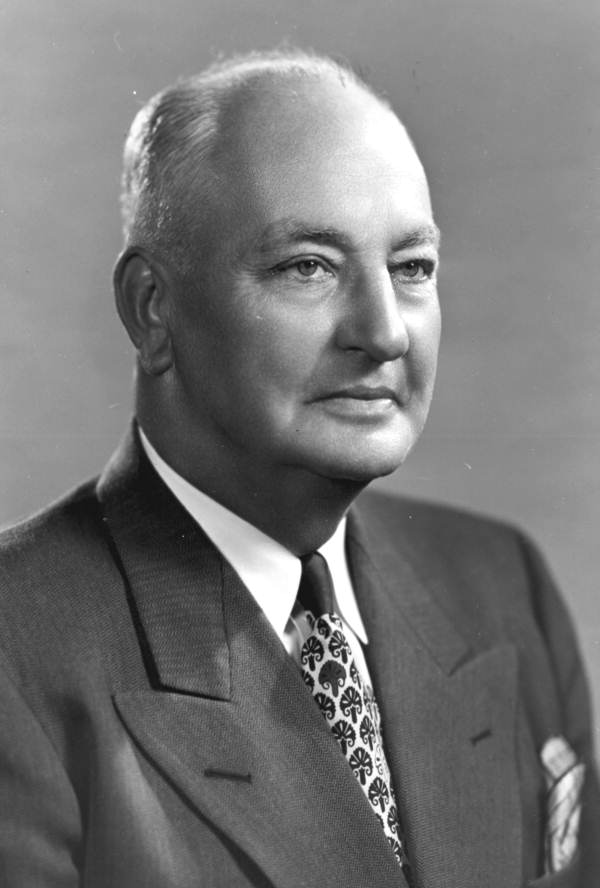
- Jones in 1951

Member of the Florida House of Representatives from Collier County
- In office 1951

Personal details
- Died: April 1953
- Party: Democratic
- Children: David Crockett Jones Jr.

David Crockett Jones Sr. (died April 1953) was an American politician. He served as a Democratic member of the Florida House of Representatives.
